James Francis Crocicchia (born February 19, 1964) is a former professional American football quarterback in the National Football League. He was a replacement player with the New York Giants in 1987. In 1988, Crocicchia played for the New York Knights of the Arena Football League.

College career
Crocicchia played for the University of Pennsylvania, leading the Quakers to three straight Ivy League championships in 1984-86.

Professional career

New York Giants
After going unselected in the 1987 NFL Draft, Crocicchia was signed by the New York Giants during the 1987 NFL strike. He started for New York in Giants Stadium on Monday night, October 5, 1987 against the San Francisco 49ers, making him the first ex-Penn quarterback to play in an NFL game since Pard Pearce in the 1920s. However, Crocicchia was not effective, completing only six of fifteen passes for 89 yards and a touchdown; he was replaced with Mike Busch in the second half. The 49ers won, 41-21, and Crocicchia was cut the next day.

New York Knights
In 1988, Crocicchia played for the New York Knights of the Arena Football League. As the Knights starting quarterback, Crocicchia went 111-for-238 for 1,601 yards, with 26 touchdowns and nine interceptions. (Crocicchia's favourite receiver, with 40 receptions, was Edwin Lovelady, who had played with him on the Giants.) The Knights went just 2-10 under Crocicchia, however, and when the Knights folded at the end of the season, it spelled the end of the quarterback's pro career as well.

References

External links
Pro-Football reference

1964 births
Living people
Sportspeople from Waterbury, Connecticut
Players of American football from Connecticut
American football quarterbacks
Penn Quakers football players
New York Giants players
New York Knights (arena football) players